Mateete is a town in the Central Region of Uganda.

Location
Mateete is on the  Sembabule–Mateete–Lwensinga Road, about equidistant from Sembabule to the north, where the district headquarters are located, and Lwensinga, which lies on the Masaka–Mbarara Road, to the south. The coordinates of the town are 0°14'32.0"S, 31°29'17.0"E (Latitude:-0.242234; Longitude:31.488044).

Overview
Mateete is a growing urban centre. One of the alarming developments is the high number of girls aged 15 to 18 years, engaged in the prostitution trade in the town.

Population
The population of Mateete Municipality was estimated at 5,000 in 2011.

Points of interest
 offices of Mateete Town Council
 Mateete central market
 headquarters of Mateete sub-county in Mawogola County
 Sembabule–Mateete–Lwensinga Road, passing through the middle of town in a general north/south direction.
 Bamu Hospital - a private healthcare facility

See also
 Sembabule
 List of cities and towns in Uganda

References

Populated places in Central Region, Uganda
Cities in the Great Rift Valley
Sembabule District